xxx

Dennis Oehler is a paralympic athlete from the United States competing mainly in category PS4 pentathlon and TS2 sprint events.

Dennis competed in three Paralympics for the United States winning a toal of 10 medals including four gold.  At his first games in 1988 he won the 100m, 200m and 400m all in new world records, he also helped the United States team to win the bronze medal in the 4 × 100 m. At the 1992 Summer Paralympics Dennis didn't compete in the 400m and was unable to defend his titles in the 100m and 200m finishing second and third respectively he did however win a gold medal in the long jump in a new world record, he also won silver in the pentathlon and as part of the United States 4 × 100 m relay team.  His third games came in his home country for the 1996 Summer Paralympics where he competed in the 100m and long jump and won a bronze medal in the 4 × 100 m.

Dennis was inducted into the Suffolk Sports Hall of Fame on Long Island in the Track & Field Category with the Class of 2000.

References

External links 
 

Paralympic track and field athletes of the United States
Athletes (track and field) at the 1988 Summer Paralympics
Athletes (track and field) at the 1992 Summer Paralympics
Athletes (track and field) at the 1996 Summer Paralympics
Paralympic gold medalists for the United States
Paralympic silver medalists for the United States
Paralympic bronze medalists for the United States
American male sprinters
American male long jumpers
American pentathletes
Living people
Year of birth missing (living people)
Medalists at the 1988 Summer Paralympics
Medalists at the 1992 Summer Paralympics
Medalists at the 1996 Summer Paralympics
Paralympic medalists in athletics (track and field)
Sprinters with limb difference
Long jumpers with limb difference
Paralympic sprinters
Paralympic long jumpers